The Order of the Estonian Red Cross was instituted in 1920 by the Estonian Red Cross Society. The Order of the Estonian Red Cross is bestowed in order to give recognition for humanitarian services rendered in the interests of the Estonian people and for the saving of life.

Classes
The Order of the Estonian Red Cross comprises six classes:
 Five basic classes – 1st, 2nd, 3rd, 4th and 5th class;
 One medal class.

The crosses of all basic classes of the Order of the Estonian Red Cross have the same design.

The blue colour tone of the moiré ribands belonging to the decorations of all the classes of the Order of the Estonian Red Cross is determined according to the international PANTONE colour-table as 297 MC.

See also
 International Red Cross and Red Crescent Movement

References

External links

 List of recipients
 Estonian Red Cross

Orders, decorations, and medals of Estonia
Awards established in 1920
1920 establishments in Estonia
Estonian Red Cross